Glen Raven is a historic mansion in Cedar Hill, Tennessee, USA. It was built from 1897 to 1902 by Felix Grundy Ewing and Jane Washington. It has been listed on the National Register of Historic Places since October 2, 1973.

References

Houses on the National Register of Historic Places in Tennessee
Victorian architecture in Tennessee
Houses completed in 1902
Buildings and structures in Robertson County, Tennessee
National Register of Historic Places in Robertson County, Tennessee